The Plumed Serpent is a 1926 political novel by D. H. Lawrence; Lawrence conceived the idea for the novel while visiting Mexico in 1923, and its themes reflect his experiences there. The novel was first published by Martin Secker's firm in the United Kingdom and Alfred A. Knopf in the United States; an early draft was published as Quetzalcoatl by Black Swan Books in 1995. The novel's plot concerns Kate Leslie, an Irish tourist who visits Mexico after the Mexican Revolution. She encounters Don Cipriano, a Mexican general who supports a religious movement, the Men of Quetzalcoatl, founded by his friend Don Ramón Carrasco. Within this movement, Cipriano is identified with Huitzilopochtli and Ramón with Quetzalcoatl. Kate eventually agrees to marry Cipriano, while the Men of Quetzalcoatl, with the help of a new President, bring about an end to Christianity in Mexico, replacing it with pagan Quetzalcoatl worship.

The novel received a varied reception. Novelists such as British writer E. M. Forster considered it Lawrence’s best literary work. Literary critics have different opinions about its literary merit. Some have found it inferior to his other work, but others have considered it his greatest accomplishment as a novelist, an assessment shared by Lawrence himself. The novel received attention in Mexico, where its reception was positive, and it was praised by the Nobel laureate Octavio Paz. The Plumed Serpent has been compared to other works by Lawrence such as the novels Kangaroo (1923) and Lady Chatterley's Lover (1928), and the essays Sketches of Etruscan Places and other Italian essays (1932), as well as to the work of the poet T. S. Eliot.

Some commentators have characterised it as fascist and as an attack on Christianity, and others have discussed the supposed belief of women's submission to men that is allegedly present in the novel. It has also been interpreted as an expression of Lawrence’s personal political ambition and as having homoerotic aspects.

Plot
Note: this description of the plot is based on the version of the book published as The Plumed Serpent, not the version published as Quetzalcoatl.

Shortly after Easter, a group of tourists visiting Mexico, including Kate Leslie, an Irishwoman, and her cousin, Owen Rhys, an American, attend a bullfight in Mexico City. Leslie is thrilled at the prospect of witnessing the fight, but later leaves in disgust, after witnessing the violence suffered by a horse and a bull. As she leaves, she encounters Don Cipriano, a Mexican general, and invites him to meet her. Later, at a party in Tlacolula which she attends with Rhys, Leslie listens to discussions of changes brought about by the Mexican Revolution, and encounters a Major Law, who states that there is a rumour that the recently elected Mexican President, Socrates Tomás Montes of the Labour Party, will be prevented from taking office by the military. She also meets Cipriano's friend Don Ramón Carrasco. Soon afterwards, she reads a newspaper report, "The Gods of Antiquity Return to Mexico", describing an incident in the village of Sayula, in which a man arose from a lake, then announced to a group of women that the Aztec gods Quetzalcoatl and Tlaloc are ready to return to Mexico. Rhys returns to the United States, but Leslie decides to stay in Mexico. Wanting to leave Mexico City because of rising social tensions, she travels to Sayula, with the encouragement of Cipriano. She learns of a religious movement, the Men of Quetzalcoatl, and, upon making inquiries about it, is told that it was founded by Ramón, who is suspected of having political ambitions. Leslie begins to sympathise with Ramón, believing him to be a "great man". Receiving an invitation from Ramón, she meets him and his wife Doña Carlota, who tells her that he wants to be worshipped as a god and to destroy the belief of Mexicans in both Jesus and the Virgin Mary, objectives she deplores.

Cipriano tells Leslie that he wants to marry her and make her a goddess in a pantheon of deities alongside himself and Ramón, explaining that this will help Ramón. Leslie at first rejects these proposals and considers leaving Mexico. Meanwhile, the unpopular actions of the new President provoke a rebellion, and the Church moves against Ramón, denouncing him as an "Anti-Christ". Cipriano continues to support Ramón, despite being obliged to defend the Mexican government. Ramón tries to remain politically neutral. Cipriano arranges a meeting between Ramón and a bishop. Ramón tells Cipriano that every people in the world needs its own "Saviour", and that the "Teutonic world" should return to the worship of Thor and Wotan, just as other nations should return to the worship of their ancient gods. When Ramón and Cipriano meet the bishop, Ramón suggests to him that the Catholic Church should embrace all gods, including Quetzalcoatl; the bishop rejects this. Ramón tells the bishop that he intends to remove images from a church in Sayula, burn them, and replace them with images of Quetzalcoatl; the bishop warns him against this, but Ramón remains firm in his plans, and tells the bishop to advise his superiors of them.

Ramón tries to encourage Kate to marry Cipriano, but she still has doubts. He tells her of the dissatisfying nature of his relationship with Carlota, saying that the two of them never "met in our souls", and that her faith in Jesus and his role in the Men of Quetzalcoatl now makes this impossible. He explains to Kate that, for him, Quetzalcoatl is a "symbol of the best a man may be". Soon afterwards, a priest is attacked after preaching a sermon against Ramón and Quetzalcoatl, and later threatened with death. Priests denounce the Men of Quetzalcoatl. The church in Sayula is closed, and later entered by Ramón and a group of his followers, who remove images of Jesus, Mary, and several saints. The images are taken away and burned. These events are followed by further incidents of violence and unrest. Kate travels to Jamiltepec, where she meets Ramón and tells him that she approves of the removal of images from the church in Sayula. He encourages her to support his movement. When an attempt is made to assassinate Ramón, Kate becomes involved in the conflict, and he afterwards credits her intervention with saving his life. One of Ramón's followers tells Kate that priests and the Knights of Cortés are to blame for the attack.

Kate meets Ramón and Cipriano. Ramón tells her that just as he will be identified with Quetzalcoatl, Cipriano will be identified with Huitzilopochtli. Kate accepts Cipriano as Huitzilopochtli and they are married by Ramón. Afterwards, Kate returns to Sayula, where she learns that the church has been turned into a temple of Quetzalcoatl. A religious meeting presided over by Ramón and Cipriano is interrupted by Carlota, who calls on God to take Ramón's life. Carlota collapses and is taken to bed; she subsequently dies. Worship of Quetzalcoatl continues to spread through Mexico; Cipriano wants the President to declare it the official religion of Mexico, but Ramón disagrees, believing that it should be allowed to spread of its own accord. Cipriano gives Kate the name "Malintzi". Ramón later marries a young woman named Teresa. Kate tells first Teresa, then Cipriano, that she wants to leave Mexico. Later, an attempt is made to assassinate the President, and Mexico is taken to the point of religious war. In Mexico City, the Men of Quetzalcoatl turn a church into a Quetzalcoatl temple; the Archbishop of Mexico is arrested before he and his followers can attempt to retake the building for the Catholic Church. Eventually, the President has the Catholic Church made illegal and orders Quetzalcoatl worship made the official religion of Mexico; all churches are closed, and the Archbishop is deported. Kate and Cipriano are legally married. Ramón tells Kate to tell the Irish that they should follow their traditional gods and heroes. Kate is left conflicted about whether to leave Mexico or not.

Background and publication history

In March 1923, Lawrence, accompanied by the poet Witter Bynner and Willard Johnson, visited Mexico. There, according to the biographer Brenda Maddox, the "sight of Aztec ruins and the lush countryside outside Mexico City" gave him the idea for a book. Lawrence began writing The Plumed Serpent in May 1923. Maddox states that writing the novel was exhausting for Lawrence, and that it "nearly killed him", owing to the illness he contracted upon finishing it, which he did not expect to survive. She notes that the character of Owen Rhys was based on Bynner, and that the bullfight that occurs early in The Plumed Serpent was based on an actual bullfight Lawrence attended with Bynner and Johnson. She maintains that the bullfight scene reflects the disturbing effect on Lawrence of travelling with Bynner and Johnson, a homosexual couple.

The Plumed Serpent was first published in 1926 by Martin Secker's firm in the United Kingdom and Alfred A. Knopf in the United States. The novel has also been published by Heinemann, Penguin Books, and Vintage Books. Lawrence wanted to call the book "Quetzalcoatl", after the Aztec god of that name, but Knopf insisted on "The Plumed Serpent", a title Lawrence disliked. An early draft of the book, different enough to be considered a distinct work, was published as Quetzalcoatl by Black Swan Books in 1995.

Reception
Critics have disagreed about the literary merit of The Plumed Serpent, some, including the novelist E. M. Forster and the writer John Middleton Murry, praising it as Lawrence's best work and others dismissing it. According to John B. Vickery, while most critics admired "Lawrence's masterful descriptions, his evocation of place and his handling of individual scenes", many also criticised his "humorless obsession" with saving Mexico and the world. Lawrence's biographer Harry T. Moore states that The Plumed Serpent received negative reviews from P. C. Kennedy in the New Statesman, the journalist Katherine Anne Porter in the New York Herald Tribune, and the novelist L. P. Hartley in the Saturday Review. He adds that additional negative reviews appeared in The Times Literary Supplement, which described the novel as "feeble", and The Spectator, which described it as "verbose". However, Moore writes that it received a more mixed assessment, discussing both its good and bad aspects, from the poet Edwin Muir in The Nation and Athenaeum. Moore himself maintained that The Plumed Serpent could be considered a "magnificent failure" and that it was "a greater achievement than the smoother work of the lesser authors celebrated at that time." He considered its first six chapters to be its best part, writing that they contain "wonderful prose". He also noted that the novel sold well.

Maddox writes that the novel received a negative review from Charles Marriott in The Manchester Guardian, who deplored its failure to produce convincing characterizations, a response similar to that of Hartley in the Saturday Review. According to Maddox, Porter considered the novel inferior to Lawrence's earlier work Sons and Lovers (1913), and believed that the difference in quality between the two works showed "the catastrophe that has overtaken Lawrence." The Plumed Serpent received a mixed review from Time, which described it as "a strange, compelling state of affairs rather than a story", and wrote that it reflected the "physico-mysticism", and preoccupation with sexual psychology, of its author. Time wrote that Lawrence's work "moves many profoundly, puzzles others, and revolts the squeamish." Donald Douglas wrote in The Nation that The Plumed Serpent contains "passages of miraculous wonder and words like arrows tipped with light borrowed from the sun" and that "Lawrence has all his old infallible and inexhaustible knowledge of woman's nature and his Indians bear all the fascination of an alien life perfectly understood."

Later assessments of The Plumed Serpent include those of F. B. Pinion, who considered it the most ambitious and successful of Lawrence's novels written after Women in Love (1920). Brett Neilson compared The Plumed Serpent to Women in Love, arguing that they imagined "the primitive" in similar ways and that both involved the theme of an "eternal conjunction between two men". He compared Ramón to Rupert Birkin, a character of Women in Love, maintaining that they had similar "sexual philosophies". The critics F. R. Leavis and Harold Bloom have seen The Plumed Serpent as inferior to Women in Love, as well as to Lawrence's The Rainbow (1915). Bloom compared The Plumed Serpent to the novelist Norman Mailer's Ancient Evenings (1983), suggesting that it had a similar underlying motive. He has argued that Lawrence was writing as a political theorist in The Plumed Serpent, which he described as a "Fascist fiction".

The poet Richard Aldington described The Plumed Serpent as "curious and original". He compared it to Frederick Rolfe's novel Hadrian the Seventh (1904), arguing that "in both books the author imagines himself raised to a position of power which he never had the faintest chance of attaining in fact on this earth." He suggested that the novel shows Lawrence's "dissenting horror from the very things he is supposed to be preaching." He interpreted Cipriano and Ramón as projections of D. H. Lawrence. The writer Anthony Burgess maintained that The Plumed Serpent is the least liked of Lawrence's novels due to its lack of humour and its exploration of a theme of little interest to readers "with no knowledge of the ancient Aztec gods and what they could mean to a revitalized or Laurentianised Mexico." He called its ending unconvincing. Leavis and Burgess have compared The Plumed Serpent to Kangaroo, Burgess finding the similarity to be their shared emphasis on bloodshed. Leavis maintained that unlike The Rainbow and Women in Love, but like Aaron's Rod (1922) and Kangaroo, The Plumed Serpent was "exploratory and experimental." Though appreciating features such as its bullfight scene, he dismissed it as a bad book and the least complex of Lawrence's novels, arguing that it suffered from his single-minded concern with imagining a "revival of the ancient Mexican religion." Critics have offered differing interpretations of Kate Leslie. Aldington and Burgess saw the character as a representation of Frieda Lawrence, but Leavis maintained that Leslie was not a representation of Frieda Lawrence. The critic Frederick Crews argued that the character was simply an opportunity for Lawrence to present "Lawrentian doctrine."

The Plumed Serpent has been criticised by feminist authors such as the philosopher Simone de Beauvoir and the activist Kate Millett. De Beauvoir compared Lawrence's view of female sexuality to that of the physician Gregorio Marañón. She argued that The Plumed Serpent was the novel that most fully expressed Lawrence's ideal of female behavior, according to which the "woman must renounce personal love" and abdicate all pride and will. Millett described the novel as homoerotic. She considered its "consecration scene" an example of the "symbolically surrogate" scenes of  pederasty in Lawrence's novels. She suggested that the novel was deservedly neglected, criticising Lawrence's "protofascist tone", "fondness of force", "arrogance", and "racial, class, and religious bigotries." She maintained that the novel showed his search for triumph in politics and other areas of life, and that it records his invention of a religion of "male supremacy", with its prose celebrating "phallic supremacy". She described Leslie as a "female impersonator".

The English professor Marianna Torgovnick suggested that the novel "advocates women’s slavelike submission to men and surrender of the drive toward orgasm" and suffered from "overblown prose". She considered it, like Lady Chatterley's Lover, vulnerable to Millett's criticism. Torgovnick saw The Plumed Serpent and Lawrence's story "The Woman who Rode Away" (1925) as sharing an interest in "extremes of experience", and found both similar to the work of writers such as Bataille, and the dramatist Antonin Artaud, in their emphasis on human sacrifice. She wrote that The Plumed Serpent "has been charged with protofascism", adding that it "states its racialised theses quite clearly at times. It posts Lawrence's views, derived from theories circulating within his culture, of the fall and rise of races based upon energy and power. Lawrence's fear is specifically the fear that the white race will be supplanted". She characterised it as being, like Aaron's Rod, part of a phase of Lawrence's career during which he was suspicious of and hostile towards women.

L. D. Clark described The Plumed Serpent as "perplexing". He suggested that the work was both open to misinterpretation, and "a flagrant piece of propaganda", intended by Lawrence as a "new gospel to mankind." He believed that it suffered from faults such as "careless language", "wearisome repetitions", and the "confusion of practical with artistic ends"; he considered its "prophetic aspirations" a fault as well. However, he considered the novel redeemed by, "Lawrence's profound sympathy with the land he was writing about, and his uncanny skill at synthesizing form and setting and symbol." He argued that Lawrence was influenced by Blavatsky, and that his use of "bone symbolism" resembled Blavatsky's in The Secret Doctrine (1888). He suggested that Lawrence's interest in the symbol of the circle resulted in part from his reading of occult writers such as Blavatsky. He concluded that the novel's symbolism endowed it with "peculiar brilliance." He noted that one scene, involving Ramón and Cipriano, had been interpreted as evidence of Lawrence's "latent homosexuality", but rejected the interpretation.

The cultural critic Philip Rieff described the work as "a novel of pagan religiosity". Rieff stated that in his "imaginative rehabilitation" of Aztec ritual, Lawrence "rightly understands sun dancing as an imitation — or a dramatic representation — performed in substantiation of the divine concern with the human being." However, he saw the work as an embarrassment even to Lawrence's admirers. The critic Frank Kermode wrote that in 1928 Lawrence accepted Bynner's criticism of the "leadership mystique" advocated in the novel.

The philosopher Michel Foucault considered The Plumed Serpent an example of how the modern "deployment of sexuality" has encouraged "the desire for sex—the desire to have it, to have access to it, to discover it, to liberate it, to articulate it in discourse, to formulate it in truth".

The writer Henry Miller maintained that Lawrence showed "great creativity" in The Plumed Serpent, finding it apparent in the way Lawrence dealt with "the eternal duality in man's nature" by deifying it in the form of Quetzalcoatl. He compared its themes to those of Lawrence's The Man Who Died (1929), and praised the way in which Lawrence employed "the old myth of the dragon." The novelist William S. Burroughs was influenced by The Plumed Serpent.

The Mexican intellectual Enrique Krauze described The Plumed Serpent as "the most fascist" of Lawrence's writings, citing its "deification of violence and masculine power".

The critic William York Tindall compared The Plumed Serpent to the poet Samuel Taylor Coleridge's Kubla Khan, Gustave Flaubert's Salammbô, and the paintings of Paul Gauguin. He called it a "great novel" and "metaphor for a feeling about reality". Maddox compared The Plumed Serpent to Kangaroo, describing both novels as successors to Aaron's Rod. She also compared it to Lady Chatterley's Lover, which likewise features a man who "condescendingly instructs a woman in how to be a woman." She stated that Frieda Lawrence, like D. H. Lawrence, considered it his greatest novel, and shared its message, which Maddox summarized as being that, "Christianity was outmoded and destructive and that the white races must find new modes of leadership to prevent the dark races from dragging them into anarchy." She observed that one scene featuring Ramón appearing before a rally evoked the Third Reich to later readers and encouraged the view that Lawrence was a fascist. She also stated that the work influenced Rolf Gardiner.

The cultural critic William Irwin Thompson that the novel shows that Lawrence misunderstood the religion of ancient Mexico. The English professor Louis L. Martz stated that The Plumed Serpent resembles the Bible in its "combination of prose and poetry, its mingling of narrative and description with songs and hymns, lyrical sermons and eloquent authorial ruminations, along with its frequent use of occult symbols". He found the work a success so long as it is "read as a novel of prophecy". However, he found the published version of The Plumed Serpent in some ways inferior to the early version titled "Quetzalcoatl", noting that the early version gave Leslie a more significant role.

Anne Fernihough described The Plumed Serpent as "stridently ideological", while Mark Kinkead-Weekes described it as more "ideologically elaborated" and assertive than its early version Quetzalcoatl, adding that Lawrence made a "deliberate and intransigent" attack on Christianity. He wrote that most reactions to it were either strongly positive or strongly negative, and stated that Lawrence later rejected "both the political and the sexual ideology" of the novel. Helen Sword compared The Plumed Serpent to Lady Chatterley's Lover, describing them both as novels in which, "Lawrence uses a woman's voice and consciousness to convey the message that women should submit physically and emotionally to men", while Paul Eggert described Lawrence's attempt to portray a "society renovated by a new religion" as pretentious and strained, Michael Bell called The Plumed Serpent strident and desperate in its rhetoric and maintained that, like Kangaroo, it showed sympathy for political authoritarianism, and Chris Baldick wrote that Leavis's dismissal of The Plumed Serpent has been accepted by most subsequent critics, including the philosopher Eliseo Vivas and Julian Moynahan, and has become part of a consensus.

Vickery considered it unfair to reduce the novel to a political plan, arguing that Lawrence's central concern was that people were being led "further and further away from the realization of their own essential nature", and that Lawrence's own views were different from those of Ramón. He considered Lawrence's approach to primitive myth and ritual in The Plumed Serpent consistent with that he later took in Sketches of Etruscan Places and other Italian essays, maintaining that Lawrence used the character Ramón to depict "the attainment of an integrated personality". He compared the novel to the poet T. S. Eliot's poem The Waste Land (1922), observing that both works juxtaposed "past and present".

Donna Przybylowicz maintained that the novel revealed a conflict between contradictory fascist and liberal humanist tendencies within Lawrence's work. She compared Lawrence to Leavis and Eliot, suggesting that like Eliot, Lawrence believed that "all crises of a capitalistic post-war society of class-conflict could be transcended by ignoring history and replacing it with myth", although with the difference that Eliot's views were Christian and Lawrence's "paganistic". She argued that The Plumed Serpent, by depicting the proletariat and Indian peasants as needing to be controlled by a dictatorial leader, revealed Lawrence as "basically anti-democratic and anti-socialist", and that it also presented a "Western stereotyped notion" of "the dark races" as "lazy, dirty, resentful, covetous, irresponsible, and aimless". She believed that Lawrence "correctly portrays the crisis of Mexican society as resulting from reification and social fragmentation", but criticised him for repudiating "revolutionary political change" and wanting to maintain class divisions.

Lydia Blanchard described the novel as "puzzling", and wrote that it was "infrequently admired even by Lawrence admirers", with most readers finding it flawed, due to its "turgid" language, "wooden" characters, and "improbable" plot. She observed that it had been seen as a "prelude to fascism". Karen McLeod Hewitt described the novel as "unpleasant nonsense", writing that most of it celebrated "a disgust for people which is also pretentious." However, she praised the "brief passages" in which Leslie's reactions to the cruelties of Mexico were "dramatized with passion" and showed respect for the character.

David Carroll maintained that compared to its early version Quetzalcoatl, the novel's published version showed "more intimate knowledge of Mexican culture" and explored "the confrontation of white and red consciousness" with greater complexity. Jad Smith wrote that The Plumed Serpent is often regarded as "the height of Lawrence’s interest in authoritarian politics" and was a "notorious instance of Lawrence’s proto-fascist leanings". However, he noted that Lawrence subsequently wrote letters, including one to Bynner, "that appear to repudiate his leadership vision". He argued that they did not represent a change in Lawrence's views, and stressed that Lawrence did not necessarily endorse fascist politics, despite the presence of "proto-fascist ideologies" in the novel and its racism. He also argued that it reflected "Lawrence’s familiarity with German thought and culture".

Duane Edwards described the novel as Lawrence's "most profound expression of what the human psyche is", and suggested that it prepared the way for Lawrence's later novel Lady Chatterley's Lover. He maintained that it was disturbing because it "makes readers aware of their primitive, pre-conscious self, which connects them with their most ancient ancestors". He observed that the novel had received a more negative response than any other work by Lawrence, finding it surprising that it had "so many detractors." He disputed the characterisation of the work as racist and fascist, maintaining that Lawrence's views should not be confused with those of his characters Cipriano and Ramón. Julianne Newmark compared the novel to Willa Cather's The Professor's House (1925), arguing that both were inspired by "engagement with evocative American places—specifically the high deserts and rugged expanses of the American southwest" and are concerned with "the ways place constitutes new identities." She questioned the charge that The Plumed Serpent is racist and that Lawrence's views resembled those of "white supremacists". Damien Barlow wrote that "a queer approach to reading Lawrence's modernist fiction" has been proposed.

Armando Pereira maintained that the novel reflected Lawrence's desire to "live in a creative way and free of the oppressive rationality, anxiety of technique and obsession of progress that had swallowed Europe up." Nora Marisa León-Real Méndez argued that Lawrence "confers significant meaning to the landmarks, constructing a narrative space that is particular as well as linked to the Mexico outside the text." Camelia Raghinaru argued that there was a connection between Lawrence's interest in the Kabbalah, which may have developed from his reading, early in the 20th century, of the occultist, and founder of the Theosophical Society, Helena Blavatsky, and his development of a "messianic utopia" in The Plumed Serpent. She saw the novel as dealing with "magical and mystical secrets whose purpose is to enact a messianic eschatology" and believed that it revealed Lawrence's preoccupation with "femininity and its mystical significance." She wrote that Lawrence saw The Plumed Serpent as "a magical incantation" intended to "change the world". She interpreted the novel in terms of the philosopher Julia Kristeva's emphasis on abjection in Powers of Horror (1980), and maintained that it emphasised "male sexuality and female submission".

Luis Gómez Romero compared the novel to Kangaroo, writing that in both works Lawrence, "exposes the advent of discrete crises resulting from the failure of human ideals and institutions to prevent and tame violence." He noted that critics had often regarded the work as a "direct expression of Lawrence’s proto-fascist propensities." He questioned the view that its plot had little to do with actual Mexican politics, arguing that it should be viewed "in a specifically Mexican context." He also observed that the early reception of The Plumed Serpent in Mexico was positive, citing the views of the newspaper Excélsior and the poet Bernardo Ortiz de Montellano, who both credited Lawrence with understanding Mexico and the Mexicans. He also noted the similar appreciative views of the intellectual Antonio Castro Leal and the poet Octavio Paz. However, he stated that "Mexican post-revolutionary nationalism and the rise of post-colonial studies" later displaced such positive views of the novel in Mexico. He noted the poet José Juan Tablada's accusation of plagiarism against Lawrence, but discounted it, writing that The Plumed Serpent had little in common with Tablada's La Resurrección de los Ídolos (1924). Vladimiro Rivas Iturralde  maintained that Lawrence wrote about "the transformation of man in myth" in an "improbable way" and that The Plumed Serpent was an "artistic failure."

Debra A. Castillo compared the novel to the anthropologist Tobias Schneebaum's Keep the River on Your Right (1969) and the work of the intellectual Georges Bataille. She maintained that it "stands out among the hundreds of novels and stories written by Anglo-Americans and set in Mexico for the particular forcefulness of Lawrence's obsession with, and equally forceful rejection of, that country and its people." She considered the work racist, and deemed it unsurprising that Lawrence considered it his best novel, arguing that he did so because he found Mexico, as a foreign society, an ideal subject on which to project his personal "obsessions". Nevertheless, she believed that the novel contained valuable insights into the state of Mexico after the Mexican Revolution. She noted that of those Mexican writers who had discussed the novel, the poet José Emilio Pacheco warned against its "proto-fascism", while Paz praised its "depiction of landscape". David Barnes noted that while Lawrence regarded the novel as his most important, he made little reference to it after its publication, and that it is usually held that he later rejected its themes for new concerns in the late 1920s, expressed in works such as Lady Chatterley's Lover. He criticised the novel's "misogyny", "authoritarian politics", and "racial essentialism", but nevertheless saw it as part of an important "political debate about what forms of nationhood might emerge in the 1920s" and showed awareness of "the possibilities of nation as utopian community." He maintained that while Bynner's negative judgment of the novel, expressed in his memoir Journeys with Genius, had affected its reputation, Lawrence was more interested in "Mexican revolutionary culture" than Bynner's comments suggested. He argued that the novel's themes were to some extent similar to those of Lady Chatterley's Lover. He also compared the novel to Kangaroo and Sketches of Etruscan Places and other Italian essays.

Shirley Bricourt argued that episodes in the novel such as the bullfight scene depict rites that both "act as catalysers of emotions" and "travesty these emotions as a submissive but passionate response." She compared the novel to Kangaroo. Juliette Feyel compared The Plumed Serpent to Kangaroo, describing them as Lawrence's "most explicitly political novels". She compared both work's to Civilization and Its Discontents (1930), by Sigmund Freud, the founder of psychoanalysis, maintaining that Lawrence and Freud both "correlate individual neurosis with civilization."

See also
 Fascism
 Mornings in Mexico
 Polytheistic reconstructionism

References

Bibliography
Books

 
 
 
 
 
 
 
 
 
 
 
 
 
 
 
 
 
 
 
 
 
 
 
 
 
 
 
 

Journals

  
  
  
 
 
  
  
  
  
 
  
  
 
 
 
  
 
 
  
 
 
  

Online articles

External links 
 
 Völkisch Organicism and the Use of Primitivism in Lawrence’s The Plumed Serpent

1926 British novels
Alfred A. Knopf books
Aztecs in fiction
British political novels
English novels
Martin Secker books
Novels about religion
Novels by D. H. Lawrence